The yellow-throated bush sparrow (Gymnoris superciliaris), also known as the yellow-throated petronia, is a species of bird in the sparrow family Passeridae. It is found in south-central and southern Africa in its natural habitats of subtropical or tropical dry forests, dry savanna, and subtropical or tropical dry shrubland.

References

External links

Yellow-throated petronia in The Atlas of Southern African Birds

yellow-throated bush sparrow
Birds of Sub-Saharan Africa
Birds of Southern Africa
yellow-throated bush sparrow
yellow-throated bush sparrow
Taxonomy articles created by Polbot